Bustan (also Romanized as Būstān; also known as Bostān Bozorg, Bushan, and Būstān-e Bozorg) is a village in Babuyi Rural District, Basht District, Basht County, Kohgiluyeh and Boyer-Ahmad Province, Iran. At the 2006 census, its population was 1,019, in 188 families.

References 

Populated places in Basht County